Stalling or Stallings can refer to:

Meanings derived from the term "stall", see Stall (disambiguation)

People
Stalling (surname)
Stallings (surname)

Places

 Stallings, North Carolina, a town in North Carolina
 Stallings Field, an airport in North Carolina, USA
 Stallings Island, an archeological site in Georgia with shell mounds

Science and computing

 Stall (fluid dynamics), in aviation and fluid dynamics, a sudden reduction in lift from exceeding a foil's critical angle of attack (such as when a plane climbs too steeply and slowly)
 Compressor stall, in jet-engine aviation
 Stalling (gaming), obstruction of the flow of play while leading in a timed game
 Pipeline stall, in computing
 Stallings theorem about ends of groups, a theorem by John R. Stallings